Dar Bagh or Darbagh or Dar-e Bagh may refer to:
 Darbagh, Gilan
 Darbagh, Hormozgan
 Dar Bagh, Isfahan
 Dar Bagh, Bam, Kerman Province
 Dar Bagh, Shahr-e Babak, Kerman Province
 Dar Bagh, Lorestan
 Darbagh, Yazd

See also
 Darreh Bagh (disambiguation)